Singidella is an extinct genus of prehistoric frog from the Eocene of Tanzania. It is a member of the family Pipidae, and is closely related to African dwarf frogs (Hymenochirus) and Merlin's dwarf gray frog (Pseudohymenochirus).

References

See also
 Prehistoric amphibian
 List of prehistoric amphibians

Prehistoric frogs
Paleogene amphibians of Africa
Eocene amphibians
Pipidae